Cachún cachún ra ra! was a Mexican comedy series that was produced from 1981 to 1987 for Televisa. Cachún cachún ra ra! was a teen comedy show whose setting was in high school. In addition to the usual trials and traumas of adolescence, the students  of the school had to contend with the wrath of their nasty school principal, a woman who's been dubbed "Godzilla." The title refers to a typical fight cheer often chanted in sports events in Mexico.

The show set the stage for future Hispanic television sitcoms. Many Cachunes became superstars after their time in the show, such as Adela Noriega, Eugenio Derbez, Nailea Norvind, Fernando Arau, Ernesto Laguardia and several others.

Cast

Awards

TVyNovelas Awards

References

External links

Mexican children's television series
1981 Mexican television series debuts
1987 Mexican television series endings
1980s Mexican television series
1980s high school television series
1980s teen sitcoms
Television series about teenagers